Odra may refer to:

Rivers
 Odra (Poland), also known as Oder, a river in Czech Republic, Poland and Germany
 Odra (Kupa), a river in Croatia
 Odra (Spain), a river in Spain

Populated places
 Odra, Silesian Voivodeship, a village in southern Poland
 Odra, Lubusz Voivodeship, a village in western Poland
 Odra Kingdom, a kingdom of ancient India
 Odra, Zagreb, a village in Croatia
 Odra Sisačka, a village in Croatia

Other uses
 Office of Dispute Resolution for Acquisition, an independent tribunal within the United States Federal Aviation Administration
 Odra (computer), a computer once made in Poland
 Odra (magazine), a Polish art and culture magazine
 Odra Wodzisław, a Polish football club from Wodzisław Śląski
 Odra Opole, a Polish football club from Opole